Evrymenes was a short-lived municipality (1996–2010) in the Ioannina Prefecture, Greece. Following the massive mergers that took place in accordance to Kallikratis Plan, since 2011 it holds the status of "municipal entity" (subdivision) within the Municipality of Zitsa. The municipal unit has an area of 73.958 km2. In 2011 its population was 1,009. The seat of the entity was in Klimatia. It is situated in the mountainous western part of the Ioannina regional unit.

Communities
Evrymenes is subdivided into 8 communities, consisting of a total number of 11 villages.
Delvinakopoulo (Delvinakopoulo, Spilaio)
Klimatia
Kokkinochoma
Lefkothea
Paliouri
Raiko
Soulopoulo (Soulopoulo, Mikro Soulopoulo)
Vasilopoulo (Vasilopoulo, Kastri)

Population

External links
Evrymenes on GTP Travel Pages
Ex-municipality of Evrymenes at the Ministry of Statistics homepage 
Information about Evrymenes at Epirus Connection

References

Populated places in Ioannina (regional unit)